Samir Uttamlal Mehta is an Indian billionaire businessman. Together with his brother, Sudhir, they run Torrent Group, which was founded by their late father, U. N. Mehta.

In September 2021, Sudhir & Samir Mehta's net worth was estimated at US$7.2 billion.

Samir Mehta has a master's degree from the B.K. School of Business Management.

Samir Mehta is a Gujarati.

References

Living people
Indian billionaires
Year of birth missing (living people)
Gujarati people
Torrent Group